Blue Origin LLC. is an American privately funded aerospace manufacturer and sub-orbital spaceflight services company headquartered in Kent, Washington. Blue Origin was founded in 2000 by former CEO of Amazon Jeff Bezos, and was led by Rob Meyerson between 2003 to 2017, serving as the company's first president. He was succeeded by Bob Smith who became the company's first CEO. In 2014, Blue Origin moved into orbital spaceflight development as a rocket engine contractor for the BE-4, which suffered delays as a result of a number of technical and managerial problems.

History 

Blue Origin was founded in 2000 by Jeff Bezos, the founder and current executive chairman of Amazon. Rob Meyerson joined Blue Origin in 2003 and served as the company's long-time president before leaving the company in late 2018. 

The company primarily employs an incremental approach from suborbital to orbital flight, with each developmental step building on its prior work.

Blue Origin moved into the orbital spaceflight technology development business in 2014, initially as a rocket engine supplier for others via a contractual agreement to build a new large rocket engine, the BE-4, for major US launch system operator United Launch Alliance (ULA). Blue Origin said the "BE-4 would be 'ready for flight' by 2017." 

On July 20, 2021, the company successfully completed its first crewed mission, Blue Origin NS-16, into space using its New Shepard launch vehicle. The flight was approximately 10 minutes and crossed the Kármán line.

New Shepard performed six crewed flights between July 2021 and August 2022, taking a mix of sponsored celebrities such as Wally Funk and William Shatner, and paying customers. New Shepard ticket sales brought in $50 million through to June 2022. On September 2022, an uncrewed mission of the New Shepard failed due to the failure of the BE-3 main engine. The launch escape system triggered and the capsule landed safely. The remaining New Shepard vehicles were grounded pending an FAA investigation into the incident.

Launch vehicles

New Shepard 

On July 20, 2021, the New Shepard performed its first crewed mission into space. The flight was approximately 10 minutes and crossed the Kármán lineThe passengers were Jeff Bezos, his brother Mark Bezos, Wally Funk, and Oliver Daemen, after the unnamed auction winner (later revealed to have been Justin Sun) dropped out due to a scheduling conflict. The second and third crewed missions of New Shepard took place in October and December 2021, respectively. Fourth crewed flight happened in March 2022. On June 4, 2022, New Shepard completed its fifth crewed mission launch after the delayed voyage previous month. The sixth crewed flight took place on August 4, 2022.

Early test vehicles

Charon 

Blue Origin's first flight test vehicle, called Charon after Pluto's moon, was powered by four vertically mounted Rolls-Royce Viper Mk. 301 jet engines rather than rockets. The low-altitude vehicle was developed to test autonomous guidance and control technologies, and the processes that the company would use to develop its later rockets. Charon made its only test flight at Moses Lake, Washington on March 5, 2005. It flew to an altitude of  before returning for a controlled landing near the liftoff point.

As of 2016, Charon is on display at the Museum of Flight in Seattle, Washington.

Goddard 
The next test vehicle, named Goddard (also known as PM1), first flew on November 13, 2006. The flight was successful. A test flight for December 2 never launched. According to Federal Aviation Administration records, two further flights were performed by Goddard.

PM2 
Another early suborbital test vehicle, PM2, had two flight tests in 2011 in west Texas. The vehicle designation may be short for "Propulsion Module".

The first flight was a short hop (low altitude, VTVL takeoff and landing mission) flown on May 6, 2011. The second flight, August 24, 2011, failed when ground personnel lost contact and control of the vehicle. Blue Origin released its analysis of the failure nine days later. As the vehicle reached a speed of Mach 1.2 and  altitude, a "flight instability drove an angle of attack that triggered [the] range safety system to terminate thrust on the vehicle".

Other projects

New Armstrong 
At the time of the announcement of New Glenn in 2016, Jeff Bezos revealed that the next project after New Glenn would be called New Armstrong, without detailing what that would be. Media have speculated that New Armstrong would be a launch vehicle named after Neil Armstrong, the first man to walk on the Moon.

Blue Moon 
In May 2019, Jeff Bezos announced plans for a crew-carrying lunar lander known as "Blue Moon." The lander will use the BE-7 hydrolox engine.

Rocket engines 
Following Aerojet's acquisition of Pratt & Whitney Rocketdyne in 2012, Blue Origin president Rob Meyerson saw an opportunity to fill a gap in the defense industrial base. Blue Origin publicly entered the liquid rocket engine business by partnering with ULA on the development of the BE-4, and working with other companies. Meyerson announced the selection of Huntsville, Alabama as the location of Blue Origin's rocket production factory in June 2017.

BE-1 
Blue Engine 1, or BE-1, was the first rocket engine developed by Blue Origin and was used in the company's Goddard development vehicle.

BE-2 
Blue Engine 2, or BE-2, was a pump-fed bipropellant engine burning kerosene and peroxide which produced  of thrust. Five BE-2 engines powered Blue Origin's PM-2 development vehicle on two test flights in 2011.

BE-3 

Blue Origin publicly announced the development of the Blue Engine 3, or BE-3, in January 2013, but the engine had begun development in the early 2010s. Early thrust chamber testing began at NASA Stennis in 2013.

By late 2013, the BE-3 had been successfully tested on a full-duration suborbital burn, with simulated coast phases and engine relights, "demonstrating deep throttle, full power, long-duration and reliable restart all in a single-test sequence." NASA has released a video of the test.

BE-4 

Blue Engine 4, or BE-4, will combust liquid oxygen and liquid methane propellants. The engine has been designed to produce  of thrust.

In late 2014, Blue Origin signed an agreement with United Launch Alliance (ULA) to co-develop the BE-4 engine, and to commit to use the new engine on an upgraded Atlas V launch vehicle, replacing the single RD-180 Russian-made engine. The new launch vehicle will use two of the  BE-4 engines on each first stage. The engine development program began in 2011.

On October 31, 2022, a Twitter post by the official Blue Origin account announced that the first two BE-4 engines had been delivered to ULA and were in the process of being integrated on a Vulcan rocket. In a later tweet, ULA CEO Tory Bruno said that one of the engines had already been installed on the booster, and that the other would be joining it momentarily.

BE-7 
The BE-7 engine, currently under development, is being designed for use on a lunar lander. Its first ignition tests were performed June 2019.

Pusher escape motor 
Blue Origin partnered with Aerojet Rocketdyne to develop a pusher launch escape system for the New Shepard suborbital Crew Capsule. Aerojet Rocketdyne provides the Crew Capsule Escape Solid Rocket Motor (CCE SRM) while the thrust vector control system that steers the capsule during an abort is designed and manufactured by Blue Origin.

Facilities 

Blue Origin has a development facility near Seattle, Washington, a facility in Reston, Virginia and a privately owned spaceport in West Texas. Blue Origin's Reston office hosts the company's "Center of Excellence" in addition to their "Advanced Development Program, New Glenn launch system, new space infrastructure product development, and the company's Enterprise Technology team". Blue Origin has continued to expand its Seattle-area office and rocket production facilities in 2016 – purchasing an adjacent -building – and 2017, with permits filed to build a new  warehouse complex and an additional  of office space. The company's established a new headquarters and R&D facility, dubbed the O'Neill Building, in Kent, Washington, on June 6, 2020.

Blue Origin manufactures rocket engines, launch vehicles, and space capsules in Washington. Its largest engineBE-4will be produced at a new manufacturing facility in Huntsville, Alabama, which was first announced in 2017 and opened in February 2020. In 2017, Blue Origin established a manufacturing facility for launch vehicles in Florida near where they will launch New Glenn from the Cape Canaveral Space Force Station, after initiating design and construction in 2015.

The west Texas suborbital launch site is at 31°25'22.6"N 104°45'25.6"W (31.422949, -104.757120), about 20 miles north of Van Horn, Texas.

At Cape Canaveral Space Force Station, from 2016, Blue Origin have been converting Launch Complex 36 (LC-36) to launch New Glenn to orbit.

Flights

Funding 
Bezos has been criticized for spending excessive amounts of his fortune on spaceflight.

As of October 2018, Blue Origin received at least $181 million from the United States Air Force for launch vehicle development.

Collaborations

With NASA 
Blue Origin has contracted to do work for NASA on several development efforts. The company was awarded  in funding in 2009 by NASA via a Space Act Agreement under the first Commercial Crew Development (CCDev) program for development of concepts and technologies to support future human spaceflight operations. NASA co-funded risk-mitigation activities related to ground testing of (1) an innovative 'pusher' escape system, that lowers cost by being reusable and enhances safety by avoiding the jettison event of a traditional 'tractor' Launch Escape System, and (2) an innovative composite pressure vessel cabin that both reduces weight and increases safety of astronauts. This was later revealed to be a part of a larger system, designed for a biconic capsule, that would be launched atop an Atlas V rocket. On November 8, 2010, it was announced that Blue Origin had completed all milestones under its CCDev Space Act Agreement.

Milestones included (1) performing a Mission Concept Review (MCR) and System Requirements Review (SRR) on the orbital Space Vehicle, which utilizes a biconic shape to optimize its launch profile and atmospheric reentry, (2) further maturing the pusher escape system, including ground and flight tests, and (3) accelerating development of its BE-3 LOX/LH2  engine through full-scale thrust chamber testing.

In 2012, NASA's Commercial Crew Program released its follow-on CCiCap solicitation for the development of crew delivery to ISS by 2017. Blue Origin did not submit a proposal for CCiCap, but is reportedly continuing work on its development program with private funding. Blue Origin had a failed attempt to lease a different part of the Space Coast, when they submitted a bid in 2013 to lease Launch Complex 39A (LC39A) at the Kennedy Space Center – on land to the north of, and adjacent to, Cape Canaveral AFS – following NASA's decision to lease the unused complex out as part of a bid to reduce annual operation and maintenance costs. The Blue Origin bid was for shared and non-exclusive use of the LC39A complex such that the launchpad was to have been able to interface with multiple vehicles, and costs for using the launch pad were to have been shared across multiple companies over the term of the lease. One potential shared user in the Blue Origin notional plan was United Launch Alliance. Commercial use of the LC39A launch complex was awarded to SpaceX, which submitted a bid for exclusive use of the launch complex to support their crewed missions.

In September 2013 – before completion of the bid period, and before any public announcement by NASA of the results of the process – Florida Today reported that Blue Origin had filed a protest with the U.S. General Accounting Office (GAO) "over what it says is a plan by NASA to award an exclusive commercial lease to SpaceX for use of mothballed space shuttle launch pad 39A". NASA had originally planned to complete the bid award and have the pad transferred by October 1, 2013, but the protest delayed a decision until the GAO reached a decision on the protest. SpaceX said that they would be willing to support a multi-user arrangement for pad 39A.
In December 2013, the GAO denied the Blue Origin protest and sided with NASA, which argued that the solicitation contained no preference on the use of the facility as either multi-use or single-use. "The [solicitation] document merely [asked] bidders to explain their reasons for selecting one approach instead of the other and how they would manage the facility". NASA selected the SpaceX proposal in late 2013 and signed a 20-year lease contract for Launch Pad 39A to SpaceX in April 2014.

On April 30, 2020, Blue Origin's National Team, which includes Lockheed Martin, Northrop Grumman, and Draper, was awarded $579 million to develop an integrated human landing system as part of NASA's Artemis program to return humans to the Moon. On April 16, 2021, NASA awarded the Artemis moon lander work, in full, to the rival SpaceX bid. On April 26, 2021, Blue Origin filed a protest with the Government Accountability Office, citing NASA's failure "... to allow offerors to meaningfully compete for an award when the Agency's requirements changed due to its undisclosed, perceived shortfall of funding ...", as well as the Agency's performance of a "... flawed competitive acquisition in contravention of BAA rules and requirements". On July 30, 2021, the GAO denied Blue Origin's protest.

With ULA 
In September 2018, it was announced that Blue Origin's BE-4 engine had been selected by United Launch Alliance to provide first-stage rocket engines for ULA's next-generation booster design, the Vulcan rocket. The BE-4 engine is set to replace the Russian-built RD-180 currently powering ULA's Atlas V.

With military agencies 
Blue Origin cooperated with Boeing in Phase 1 of the DARPA XS-1 spaceplane program. Blue Origin was reportedly in contracting talks with the United States Space Force as well according to Lt. General David Thompson. However, such talks ceased as of December 31, 2020.

References

External links 

 

 
2000 establishments in Washington (state)
Aerospace companies of the United States
American companies established in 2000
Collier Trophy recipients
Companies based in Kent, Washington
Culberson County, Texas
Privately held companies based in Washington (state)
Private spaceflight companies
Space Act Agreement companies
Space tourism
Technology companies established in 2000